Noirot is a French surname. Notable people with the surname include:

 (1820-1902), French painter and lithographer
, (1853-1924), French painter, son of Louis Noirot
Benjamin Noirot (born 1980), French rugby union player
Ernest Noirot (1851–1913), French actor, photographer, explorer and colonial administrator
Monique Noirot (born 1941), French sprinter
Olivier Noirot (born 1969), French sprinter

French-language surnames